The JEDEC memory standards are the specifications for semiconductor memory circuits and similar storage devices promulgated by the Joint Electron Device Engineering Council (JEDEC) Solid State Technology Association, a semiconductor trade and engineering standardization organization.

JEDEC Standard 100B.01 specifies common terms, units, and other definitions in use in the semiconductor industry. JESC21-C specifies semiconductor memories from the 256 bit static RAM to DDR4 SDRAM modules.

JEDEC standardization goals
The Joint Electron Device Engineering Council characterizes its standardization efforts as follows:

JEDEC Standard 100B.01
The December 2002 JEDEC Standard 100B.01 is entitled Terms, Definitions, and Letter Symbols for Microcomputers, Microprocessors, and Memory Integrated Circuits. The purpose of the standard is to promote the uniform use of symbols, abbreviations, terms, and definitions throughout the semiconductor industry.

Units of information
The specification defines the two common units of information:
 The bit (b) is the smallest unit of information in the binary numeration system and is represented by the digits 0 and 1.
 The byte (B) is a binary character string typically operated upon as one unit. It is usually shorter than a computer word.

Unit prefixes for semiconductor storage capacity
The specification contains definitions of the commonly used prefixes kilo, mega, and giga "as a prefix to units of semiconductor storage capacity" to designate multiples of the units.

The specification cites three prefixes as follows:
 kilo (K): A multiplier equal to 1024 (210).

The specification notes that these prefixes are included in the document only to reflect common usage. It refers to the IEEE/ASTM SI 10-1997 standard as stating that "this practice frequently leads to confusion and is deprecated". The JEDEC specification takes no explicit position on this usage. The document further refers to the description of the IEC binary prefixes in Amendment 2 of IEC 60027-2, "Letter symbols to be used in electrical technology", for an alternate system of prefixes and includes a table of the IEC prefixes in the note. However the JEDEC specification does not explicitly include the IEC prefixes in the list of general terms and definitions.

The document notes that these prefixes are used in their decimal sense for serial communication data rates measured in bits.

JESD21-C
The standard JESD21-C: Configurations for Solid State Memories is maintained by JEDEC committee JC41. This committee consists of members from manufacturers of microprocessors, memory ICs, memory modules, and other components, as well as component integrators, such as video card and personal computer makers. Standard 21 is published in loose-leaf binder format to accommodate frequent updates.

The documentation of modern memory modules, such as the standards for the memory ICs and a reference design of the module requires over one hundred pages. The standards specify the physical and electrical characteristics of the modules, and include the data for computer simulations of the memory module operating in a system.

Memory modules of the DDR2-SDRAM type are available for laptop, desktop, and server computers in a wide selection of capacities and access speeds. The standards specify memory module label formats for end-user markets. For example:
 1GB 2Rx4 PC2-3200P-333-11-D2 is a 1 GB DDR2 Registered DIMM, with address/command parity function, using 2 ranks of x4 SDRAMs operational to PC2-3200 performance with CAS Latency = 3, tRCD = 3, tRP = 3, using JEDEC SPD revision 1.1, raw card reference design file D revision 2 used for the assembly.

Storage capacities
The JEDEC terms dictionary includes definitions for prefixes kibi (Ki), mebi (Mi), gibi (Gi) and tebi (Ti) as powers of 2, and kilo, mega, giga and tera as powers of 10.  For example,
240 tebi Ti tera + binary: (210)4 =  tera: (103)4

The JEDEC DDR3 SDRAM standard JESD-79-3f uses Mb and Gb to specify binary memory capacity: "The purpose of this Standard is to define the minimum set of requirements for JEDEC compliant 512 Mb through 8 Gb for x4, x8, and x16 DDR3 SDRAM devices."

See also
 IEC 60027
 ISO/IEC 80000
 Timeline of binary prefixes

Notes

References

External links
 Online JEDEC documents
 JESD218

Units of information
JEDEC standards